Terry W. Gipson (born April 2, 1963) is an American politician who was elected as a Democratic member of the New York Senate in November 2012, and served from January 1, 2013 through December 31, 2014, in the 200th State Legislature. He represented the state's 41st district, which covers most of Dutchess County and Putnam County. He launched a campaign for Governor of New York in 2017 to challenge incumbent Democrat Andrew Cuomo; Gipson withdrew from the race in 2018.

Early life and career
Gipson was born in Terrell, Texas and raised in Tyler, Texas. He received a BFA from Texas Tech University in 1987, and an MFA from Penn State University in 1991. Gipson served as a volunteer firefighter and worked as a design director for MTV Networks and a designer for Rockwell Architecture, before opening his own business. In 2006, Gipson opened Gipson Design Group, located in Rhinebeck, New York, where he was twice elected a trustee to the Rhinebeck Village Board before winning election to the Senate. He closed his business in January 2013, in order to work full-time as a senator.

Political career

2012 New York State Senate election
Gipson is a Democrat who was elected to the New York Senate in 2012 by edging longtime Republican Senator Stephen Saland by 2,100 votes following Saland's controversial 2011 vote in favor of same-sex marriage. Gipson was not Saland's only opponent; Saland also faced a challenge from Neil Di Carlo, who received 17,000 votes on the Conservative line. Gipson is the first and only Democrat since Franklin Delano Roosevelt to have held this seat.

State Senate tenure
As a Senator, Gipson successfully advocated for the inclusion of Dutchess and Putnam counties in the 0% manufacturing tax plan passed in the 2014–2015 state budget. His Senate office helped secure millions of dollars in grants for new job-creating enterprises throughout the Hudson Valley, and secured construction grants for The Center for the Prevention of Child Abuse in Poughkeepsie and The Imagination Station in Kent.

Gipson sponsored legislation that became law and designated Wappinger Creek as an inland waterway. This act provided the opportunity for the 13 surrounding municipalities to apply for state and federal funding for waterfront revitalization, storm water treatment, and wastewater management, among other projects.

Gipson’s office organized a strategic campaign to help the State Senate understand the urgency of helping victims with Lyme disease. During his term, the state began the process of providing funding for research and passing laws to help the victims of Lyme and other tick-borne diseases.

Gipson supported a $9 million increase to the Environmental Protection Fund and a $90 million investment in New York State Parks funding in the 2014-15 state budget. He supported a ban on hydrofracking and on the use of fracking chemicals as road de-icer in New York.

Gipson sponsored a bill to ban Pearson, the for-profit testing company, from New York State.

Gipson hosted an annual veterans' fair that connected veterans to a variety of support organizations.

Subsequent elections
In a November 2014 re-election bid, Gipson was defeated by Republican Susan J. Serino. Gipson was again defeated by Serino in a 2016 rematch.

In late 2017, Gipson announced that he would challenge incumbent Governor Andrew Cuomo in the 2018 Democratic gubernatorial primary. Gipson ended that campaign several months later when actress Cynthia Nixon announced she, too, was challenging the governor.

Later career
As of 2016, Gipson was a full-time lecturer in the Communications Department at SUNY New Paltz and teaches Speech Communication at Rensselaer Polytechnic Institute.

References

External links
Official State Senate Website
Terry Gipson at Project Vote Smart

1960s births
Date of birth missing (living people)
Living people
21st-century American politicians
Candidates in the 2018 United States elections
Democratic Party New York (state) state senators
Penn State College of Arts and Architecture alumni
People from Rhinebeck, New York
People from Tyler, Texas
Texas Tech University alumni